Sashi Triehimus Chalwe (born 16 February 1983) is a former Zambian footballer.

Career statistics

Club

Notes

International

International goals
Scores and results list Zambia's goal tally first.

References

Living people
1983 births
Zambian footballers
Zambian expatriate footballers
Association football defenders
Hong Kong Premier League players
Lusaka Dynamos F.C. players
Mamelodi Sundowns F.C. players
Bloemfontein Celtic F.C. players
F.C. AK players
Al Ahed FC players
NAPSA Stars F.C. players
Hong Kong Rangers FC players
Expatriate soccer players in South Africa
Zambian expatriate sportspeople in South Africa
Expatriate footballers in Lebanon
Expatriate footballers in Hong Kong
Zambian expatriate sportspeople in Lebanon
Lebanese Premier League players
Zambia international footballers